John Charles Herries Brooke  (June 10, 1873 – June 10, 1951) was Dean of Cape Town from 1932 to 1947.

Early years
Brooke was born in Clanwilliam, Cape Colony, the son of the Reverend Richard Brooke, rector of Clanwilliam (and afterwards archdeacon of the Cape), and his wife, Mary Sophia Bourhill.

Educated at the Diocesan College in Rondebosch (“Bishops”) (1887-1894), he graduated as a BA of the University of the Cape of Good Hope (1894), then continued his education at Keble College, Oxford (second class, theology schools, and BA, 1897; MA, 1900) and at Cuddesdon Theological College (1897).

He was made deacon in the Church of England by William Stubbs, the bishop of Oxford in 1898 and ordained priest in 1899.

Clerical career
Brooke began his career as a curate at Henley-on-Thames in the Diocese of Oxford. He thereafter returned to South Africa and was licensed successively as an itinerating priest (from September 1901) and as precentor and assistant curate of St. George’s Cathedral (from November 1904) and was instituted as rector of St. Paul’s, Rondebosch (from September 1911; served until 1925), all in the Anglican Diocese of Cape Town. He also found time to serve as editor of The Cape Church Monthly and Parish Record between 1905 and 1911. Following the outbreak of World War I he served briefly as a chaplain to the 2nd Battalion, Imperial Light Horse and the 3rd Mounted Brigade, “D” Force in German South-West Africa. In 1923 he was made examining chaplain to William Carter, the then archbishop of Cape Town and in 1925 was made honorary canon of St. George’s Cathedral. He left the Diocese of Cape Town in 1925 to serve as rector of St. Aidan’s, Yeoville, in the Diocese of Johannesburg.

Brooke was invited back to the Diocese of Cape Town in 1932 to serve as dean of Cape Town, rector of St. George’s Cathedral and archdeacon of Cape Town, where he remained until his retirement from full-time ministry in 1947. He was formally licensed as an honorcCanon of St George's Cathedral in July 1950.

He was admitted as a chaplain of the Venerable Order of the Hospital of St. John of Jerusalem in May 1946, and invested as such at an investiture held in Cape Town on 16 April 1948.

Assessment
Brooke was “a man of sincere Christian conviction and devout life, he possessed a strong character and a vivid sense of humour. He was also an outstanding sportsman and in his youth played Currie Cup rugby for Western Province.”

Family
Brooke was married in 1910 to Helen Mary Buchanan, the daughter of the Hon. Mr Justice James Buchanan and his wife, Amy St. Leger Bertram Gordon. Mrs Brooke died in Cape Town on 26 March 1911.

He was married, secondly, on 23 April 1918, by the Archbishop of Cape Town, to Audrey Mary Currey, the daughter of the Hon. Henry Latham Currey, of Pinewood, Rondebosch. The second Mrs Brooke, who was the author of the book, Robert Gray First Bishop of Cape Town (1947), died on 1 June 1985.

He had three daughters, one by his first marriage and two by his second.

Notes

1873 births
Alumni of Keble College, Oxford
19th-century South African Anglican priests
20th-century South African Anglican priests
Deans of Cape Town
Archdeacons of Cape Town
1951 deaths